is a castle structure in Chiran, Kagoshima, Minamikyūshū, Kagoshima Prefecture, Japan. The site was designated a National Historic Site.

Current
There are little remains of the castle on the present day site, just some earthworks walls and moats. In 2017, the castle was listed as one of the Continued Top 100 Japanese Castles.

See also
List of Historic Sites of Japan (Kagoshima)

References

Castles in Kagoshima Prefecture
Historic Sites of Japan
Former castles in Japan
Ruined castles in Japan
Shimazu clan